An experimental aircraft is an aircraft intended for testing new aerospace technologies and design concepts.

The term research aircraft or testbed aircraft, by contrast, generally denotes aircraft modified to perform scientific studies, such as weather research or geophysical surveying, similar to a research vessel.

United States
The term "experimental aircraft" also has specific legal meaning in Australia, the United States and some other countries; usually used to refer to aircraft flown with an experimental certificate. In the United States, this also includes most homebuilt aircraft, many of which are based on conventional designs and hence are experimental only in name because of certain restrictions in operation.

See also

 Experimental Aircraft Association
 Experimental Aircraft Programme
 List of experimental aircraft
 List of X-planes

Notes